The big free-tailed bat (Nyctinomops macrotis) is a bat species found in the Americas.

Taxonomy
It was described as a new species in 1839 by British zoologist John Edward Gray. Gray placed it in the now-defunct genus Nyctinomus, with a binomial of Nyctinomus macrotis. The holotype had been collected in Cuba by William Sharp Macleay.

Description
Its fur is glossy and variable in color, ranging from pale, reddish brown to dark brown or blackish.

Biology and ecology
Based on its wing morphology, it likely has a rapid flight. Its flight speed could exceed .

Range and habitat
Its range includes many countries in North, Central, and South America, including: Argentina, Brazil, Canada, Colombia, Cuba, the Dominican Republic, Ecuador, French Guiana, Guyana, Haiti, Jamaica, Mexico, Suriname, the United States, and Venezuela. It is possibly also found in Uruguay. The individuals documented in Canada and the U.S. states of Iowa and Kansas are considered vagrants or extralimital records. However, the species occurs as a non-vagrant in the U.S. states of Texas, California, Nevada, and Utah.

Conservation
As of 2015, it is evaluated as a least-concern species by the IUCN, which is its lowest conservation priority.

References

Nyctinomops
Mammals of Colombia
Mammals of the United States
Bats of the United States
Bats of Central America
Bats of the Caribbean
Bats of South America
Mammals described in 1839
Taxa named by John Edward Gray
Bats of Mexico
Bats of Brazil
Mammals of Haiti
Mammals of Suriname
Mammals of Jamaica
Mammals of Cuba
Mammals of Argentina
Mammals of the Dominican Republic
Mammals of French Guiana
Mammals of Venezuela